Mirta Miller (born 16 August 1948) is an Argentine film actress. She has appeared in more than 65 films since 1961. She was born in Buenos Aires, Argentina.

Selected filmography
 No Exit (1962)
 Una chica casi decente (1971)
 Dr. Jekyll y el Hombre Lobo (1972)
 The Girl from the Red Cabaret (1973)
 El gran amor del conde Drácula (Count Dracula's Great Loves) (1974) 
 Cría cuervos (1976)
 The Legion Like Women (1976)
 Doña Perfecta (1977)
 Bolero (1984)

External links

Argentine film actresses
1948 births
Living people
People from Buenos Aires
Argentine people of German descent